Brook House may refer to:

in England
 Brook House, former home of Lord Louis Mountbatten on Park Lane, London
 Brook House F.C., a non-league football club in Hayes, now known as A.F.C. Hayes
 Brook House Immigration Removal Centre at Gatwick Airport
 A listed building in Blockley, Gloucestershire

in the United States
Brook Ramble, Townsend, Delaware, listed on the NRHP in New Castle County, Delaware
Brook Hall, Abingdon, Virginia, listed on the NRHP in Washington County, Virginia

See also
Brookhouse (disambiguation)
Brook Farm (disambiguation)
Brooks House (disambiguation)